Peter Van Den Abeele (born 1 May 1966) is a Belgian cyclist. He competed at the 1996 Summer Olympics and the 2000 Summer Olympics.

References

External links
 

1966 births
Living people
Belgian male cyclists
Olympic cyclists of Belgium
Cyclists at the 1996 Summer Olympics
Cyclists at the 2000 Summer Olympics
Sportspeople from Ghent
Cyclists from East Flanders